The Nibelungs (Die Nibelungen) is a German tragedy by Friedrich Hebbel in three parts, and was originally intended for performance over two evenings. The individual parts are: The Horned Siegfried, Siegfried's Death and Kriemhild's Revenge. Hebbel wrote the drama between the years 1850 and 1860. It is one of the most noteworthy adaptations of the Nibelung material for the theater.

References

German plays
Nibelung tradition